Takenaga is a Japanese surname and masculine given name. It can be written with a few different kanji, for example bamboo–eternal (竹永) and martial–chief (武長).

People with the surname 

 Barbara Takenaga  (born 1949), abstract painter
, founder of the Yagyū Shingan-ryū martial arts tradition
 Masaharu Takenaga, commander of the World-War-II Japanese battalion that surrendered in the Takenaga incident

Fictional characters with the given name 
, character in the manga The Wallflower

Japanese-language surnames
Japanese masculine given names